The men's individual pursuit was a track cycling event held as part of the Cycling at the 1964 Summer Olympics programme.  The course was 4000 metres.  It was the first time the event had been held at the Olympics and took place on 16 October and 17 October 1964 at the Hachioji Velodrome.  24 cyclists competed.

Medalists

Results

Heats

In the first round of heats, the 24 cyclists were divided into 12 pairs.  Placing in the heats was not used to advanced; instead the 8 fastest cyclists from across the heats advanced to the quarterfinals.

Quarterfinals

The quarterfinals paired off the 8 remaining cyclists into 4 heats.  Winners advanced, losers were eliminated.

Semifinals

The winner of each semifinal advanced to the gold medal match, while the loser was sent to the bronze medal match.

Finals

Sources

References

Track cycling at the 1964 Summer Olympics
Cycling at the Summer Olympics – Men's individual pursuit